Pinus massoniana (English: Masson's pine, Chinese red pine, horsetail pine; Chinese: 馬尾松) is a species of pine, native to Taiwan, a wide area of central and southern China, and northern Vietnam.

Description 

It is an evergreen tree reaching  in height, with a broad, rounded crown of long branches. The bark is thick, grayish-brown, and scaly plated at the base of the trunk, and orange-red, thin, and flaking higher on the trunk. Pollination occurs in mid-spring, with the cones maturing 18–20 months after.

Distribution and habitat 

Ecology 
In the 1970s and 80s, the Pinewood nematode from North America and pine-needle scale insect from Taiwan, together virtually eliminated the native Pinus massoniana in Hong Kong.

Fossil record
A fossil seed cone and several needles of  Pinus massoniana have been described from the upper Miocene Wenshan flora, Yunnan, SW China.  The fossils most resemble the variety P. massoniana var. hainanensis, which is a tropical montane thermophilic tree restricted to Hainan Island in southern China.

Uses 
The species is a common tree used in plantation forestry for replacing or compensating for the loss of the natural forest in southern China. Chinese rosin is obtained mainly from the turpentine of P. massoniana and slash pine (P. elliottii).

Logs are mainly used to make pulp for paper industry.

Leaves are used to give special smoke flavor to a local black tea, such as Lapsang souchong of Fujian.

Habit

Notes

References 
 
 Pinus massoniana - Plants For A Future database report

massoniana
massoniana
Trees of Hong Kong
Trees of Taiwan
Trees of Vietnam
Least concern plants